Caio Ribeiro Decoussau (born 16 August 1975) is a Brazilian football pundit and retired footballer who played as a forward.

Club career
Born in São Paulo, Caio Ribeiro played for São Paulo, Inter Milan, Napoli, Santos, Flamengo, Fluminense, Grêmio, Rot-Weiß Oberhausen and Botafogo. When he moved from São Paulo to Inter Milan in 1995 at the age of 19, it was a record transfer for a teenager at £6.6 million.

International career
Caio Ribeiro participated at the 1995 FIFA World Youth Championship, winning the Golden Ball award.

Caio Ribeiro scored 3 goals in 4 games for the Brazil senior team in 1996.

Later career
After retiring from football Caio Ribeiro studied sports management, and became a commentator for Rede Globo in 2007.

References

1975 births
Living people
Footballers from São Paulo
Brazilian footballers
Brazil under-20 international footballers
Brazil international footballers
São Paulo FC players
Inter Milan players
S.S.C. Napoli players
Santos FC players
CR Flamengo footballers
Fluminense FC players
Grêmio Foot-Ball Porto Alegrense players
Rot-Weiß Oberhausen players
Botafogo de Futebol e Regatas players
Serie A players
Association football forwards
Brazilian expatriate footballers
Brazilian expatriate sportspeople in Italy
Expatriate footballers in Italy
Brazilian expatriate sportspeople in Germany
Expatriate footballers in Germany
1996 CONCACAF Gold Cup players